Wayne Burgess (born 1 September 1971) is a South African former cyclist. He competed in the individual road race at the 1992 Summer Olympics.

References

External links
 

1971 births
Living people
South African male cyclists
Olympic cyclists of South Africa
Cyclists at the 1992 Summer Olympics
Place of birth missing (living people)